Pavel Viktorovich Dodonov  (born November 17, 1979, Ulyanovsk) is a Russian guitarist, electronic musician and composer. He is best known as the guitarist and co-author of Dolphin, with whom he recorded four albums. Member of the DDT and Race to Space collectives.

The author of the soundtracks for Vasily Sigarev's film Living (2012; nomination for Kinotavr) and Roman Prygunov's TV series Dead Lake (2019).

Now based in Moscow, Russia.

References

External links
 Official Site

1979 births
Russian male composers
Russian male guitarists
Russian rock guitarists
21st-century Russian male musicians
21st-century guitarists
People from Ulyanovsk
Russian film score composers
Living people